David Sarpong Boateng (born 9 October 1943; died c. 2016) was a Ghanaian politician and an Educationist. He served for the Koforidua constituency in the Eastern region of Ghana as member of the first parliament of the fourth republic of Ghana.

Early life and education 
Boateng was born on October 9, 1943. He attended the University of Cape Coast and obtained his Bachelor of Arts. He had a degree in history, Sociology and Education. He also studied at Cornell University, New York where he obtained a certificate in Industrial Relations.

Politics 
Boateng was elected during the 1992 Ghanaian parliamentary election as member of the first parliament of the fourth republic of Ghana on the ticket of the National Democratic Congress. In 1996 Ghanaian general election, he lost the seat to Yaw Barima of the New Patriotic Party (NPP) who won with 26,025 votes representing 47.20% of the share. He defeated David Sarpong Boateng who obtained 18,648 votes representing 33.80% of the share, Nana Jonathan R. Osei-Bonsu of the People's National Convention (PNC) who obtained 1,366 votes representing 2.50% of the share, Kwame Larbi Nyanteh of the Convention People's Party (CPP) who obtained 249 votes representing 0.50% of the share and Edward Kwaku Boaten of the National Convention Party(NCP) who obtained 170 votes representing 0.30% of the share.

In 1997, Sarpong assured civil servants that the government had not abandoned the idea of removing disparities that have characterised wages and salaries of workers. He delivered the keynote address at the opening of a three-day emergency national executive council meeting of the Civil Servants Association of Ghana (CSAG) at Koforidua.

Career 
David Sarpong Boateng was a former Member of Parliament for Koforidua from 7 January 1993 to 7 January 1997. He was an Educationist, a former Minister of State in the Ex-President Jerry John Rawlings' Administration and former ambassador for the Embassy of Ghana in Havana (Cuba). He first taught as a pupil teacher at Kobokobo near Huhuya on the Koforidua Somanya road and later as a teacher at the Koforidua Catholic Middle school. He was also a Deputy Secretary at the Ministry of Labour and Social Welfare.

Death 
He died at the age of 72 and left behind his wife, Madam Akua Dwubi, three children and three step children.

Personal life 
He was a Christian.

See also
List of MPs elected in the 1992 Ghanaian parliamentary election
Provisional National Defence Council
Rawlings government

External sources
Former Deputy Secretary D.S. Boateng laid to rest on GBC online

References 

1943 births
2016 deaths
Ghanaian MPs 1993–1997
National Democratic Congress (Ghana) politicians
Ghanaian educators
People from Eastern Region (Ghana)
University of Cape Coast alumni
Cornell University alumni
Ghanaian Christians
Ghanaian diplomats
Ambassadors of Ghana to Cuba